Adonis Antonio Rivas Ordóñez (born 7 December 1972) is a Nicaraguan former professional boxer who competed between 1995 and 2014. He is a world champion in two weight classes, having held the WBO super flyweight title from 1999 to 2001 and the WBO flyweight title in 2002.

Professional career 
Rivas turned professional in 1995 and captured the WBO super flyweight title with a decision win over Diego Morales in 1999. He defended the belt twice before losing it to Pedro Alcázar in 2001. He dropped down in weight in 2002 to fight for the WBO flyweight title against Jair Jimenez and won a majority decision. He lost the belt later that year to Omar Andres Narvaez. In 2005 and 2006 he lost a pair of bouts against Jorge Arce for the WBC flyweight title.

Professional boxing record

External links 
 

1972 births
Flyweight boxers
Living people
Nicaraguan male boxers
Super-flyweight boxers
World Boxing Organization champions
World flyweight boxing champions
World super-flyweight boxing champions
World boxing champions
Boxers at the 1995 Pan American Games
Pan American Games competitors for Nicaragua
Sportspeople from León, Nicaragua